The Famagusta derby refers to the Famagusta's local derby, football matches played between Anorthosis Famagusta and Nea Salamis Famagusta. It is one of the rivalries of Cypriot football. The rivalry is also indicative of social, cultural and political differences.

Until 1974 the games between the two teams were taking place in Famagusta. After the Turkish invasion of Cyprus and the occupation of Famagusta by the Turkish army, the games between the two teams are taking place in Larnaca, where the two teams have their headquarters.

In recent decades the political differences, the local conflicts and the social divide were some of the elements of the rivalry between the two teams; however, due to the uprooting of the two teams, now their games are a tribute and remembrance of their occupied city.

The matches between the two teams are also called the Varoshi derby because of Varosha, the name of an area in the modern city of Famagusta.

Background

Anorthosis and Nea Salamis are the most important and historical teams of Famagusta. Anorthosis was founded in 1911 and Nea Salamina in 1948.

Anorthosis' foundation and early years
The club Anorthosis Famagusta was founded on 30 January 1911. The early years did not develop sporting action but mainly national, spiritual, cultural and social. In 1929 the club began to develop sporting action. However, the young members of the club were active at football much earlier. Since the early 1920s, they formed a group called the "Greek Football Team of Varosha". In 1929, that team officially joined Anorthosis and the players, who were all members of Anorthosis, became the first football team of the club. After that, Anorthosis took part in the first unofficial national leagues, the Cities' Championships (πρωταθλήματα πόλεων). The Cyprus Football Association (CFA) was founded in 1934, with Anorthosis being one of the founding members.

In 1947, Anorthosis along with EPA Larnaca and Pezoporikos Larnaca called for statutory change, which sought primarily for the presidency of CFA to rotate through all cities. These teams that have raised this request asking for equal treatment once thought that the clubs of Nicosia (where the CFA resided), especially APOEL, were enjoying the favor of the CFA. The request was discussed at a general meeting of the Federation on 27 August 1947, but only these three teams voted in favor of this proposal. After this result, the three teams left the CFA and created their own federation, the Football Sports Federation of Cyprus (Ποδοσφαιρική Αθλητική Ομοσπονδία Κύπρου, ΠΑΟΚ), established in Larnaca. Later on, five more clubs joined the new federation. A climate of conflict prevailed between the two federations. The conflict ended over a year later, when the Football Sports Federation of Cyprus dissolved, and the three unions (Anorthosis, EPA, Pezoporikos) reintegrated into the CFA in the autumn of 1948. This followed the establishment of leftist unions, including Nea Salamina.

Nea Salamis' foundation and early years
When Nea Salamis Famagusta was founded, Greece was entering a period of civil war between leftists and rightists. The situation in Greece affected Cyprus, both politically and socially; most athletes were also involved in politics. At this time, Famagusta had two sports clubs: Evagoras Gymnastic Association, or GSE and Anorthosis Famagusta. The GSE had many talented leftist athletes on its rosters. At Anorthosis, many players were also leftists. Under the influence of the contemporary right-wing political climate, the GSE and Anorthosis began to restrict leftist athletes. In early 1947, a group of people from Famagusta (including leftists, members and non-members of GSE and Anorthosis) concluded that there was a space for another sports club in the city. Due to the existing restrictions, they envisioned a club which would appeal to everyone in Famagusta regardless of political affiliation.

On 14 February 1948, the decision was made to establish the club, and on 7 March 1948 the Nea Salamina sports club was formed as the first leftist athletic club in Cyprus. Negative attitudes towards the left-wing athletes prevailed in other Cypriot cities and some other clubs also were formed.

Due to their left-wing political beliefs, members of the new clubs were not accepted into the Cyprus Football Association (CFA) and they established a new football federation (the Cyprus Amateur Football Federation, or CAFF) in December 1948. The new federation organized leagues and cups, which attracted thousands of fans. The CAFF matches became more popular than those of the CFA.

CAFF members favored the unification of football in Cyprus. They tried for three years to persuade the CFA to accept them as members, without any success. The existence of two football federations (with two separate championships) in a country such as Cyprus was unprecedented. The situation created economic hardship, and hampered the development and the improvement of Cypriot football. The clubs felt that sports should reflect fraternity and friendship rather than discrimination. In December 1952, the first issue of the sports newspaper Athlitiki supported the unification of Cypriot football. Foreign coaches of the CFA clubs also supported unification, leading CFA to respond that "their statements opposed the spirit of the Federation". Coaches of CFA's teams were initially hostile towards consolidation supporters. In summer 1953, the majority of Cypriot sportspeople expressed support for football unification. In August of that year Nea Salamina, Omonia, Alki Larnaca and Antaeus Limassol submitted a joint application to the CFA to join the Cypriot First Division. On 19 September, the CFA accepted Nea Salamina, Omonia and Antaeus for membership. However, the organization's negative attitude towards those clubs continued. First, the league rejected applications from Alki, Orfeas Nicosia and Neos Asteras (although the first two joined a year later), and second, arguing that according to its constitution, only one team may participate in the Cypriot First Division and two teams in the second division. The CAFF clubs accepted these conditions in the interest of unification. In an ad hoc meeting of CAFF, members agreed that Omonia would join the first division and Nea Salamina and Antaeus the second division. Following these decisions, CAFF disbanded.

First match (friendly)

The first match between teams from the two federations (a friendly game) was played by Nea Salamina and Anorthosis at GSE Stadium on 27 September 1953. The stadium was packed with 5,200 fans of the two Famagustian clubs. The final result was 3–1 in favor of Anorthosis, and the match was described by Athlitiki as an evidence of superior sportsmanship and brotherhood of fans.

The historical for Cypriot football match meant that the unification of Cyprus football was now a reality. It was the first match between a right-wing and a left-wing club in Cyprus. The match was scheduled to start at 3:25 pm. The stands of the stadium were overwhelmed with people and at 2:15 pm were already full. The stadium was filled with 5,200 fans of both teams. The entrance was set at one shilling. Total earnings had amounted to 260 pounds, a significant amount in that era. Anorthosis won 3–1 with goals from Panos Siailo (49' and 70') and Loizo Chatziloizou (64'). Nea Salamina had temporarily equalized with Antonis Vrachimis "Tzioumpis".

Players:

Anorthosis lineup: Costas Hadjigeorgiou "Kotsios", Moses Mantzalos, Xanthos Sarris (46' Phaedrus Farmakalidis), Eugene Zervidis "Voskaris" (46' George  Procopius "Prokopis"), Pambos Charalambous, Aristos Raphael (captain ), Loizos Hadjiloizou, Costakis Antoniades (Marios Papadopolos "China"), Costakis Xanthoullis, Panos Siailos, Antonis Papadopoulos

Nea Salamina lineup: Michael Sophocles "Blakkis", Takis Kkafas, Andreas Elias "Andrellis" (captain), Antrikkis, Andreas Paschalis "Fokkis", Paraschos Georgios (Andreas Papathomas), Mustafa Nitae, Vassos Kostanta (Andreas Spyrou), George Avetisian "Tziortzis", Anthony Vrachimis "Tzioumpis", Sotiris Photios "Tirimo"

Anorthosis played with striped jerseys of white and blue colors and white shorts, while Nea Salamina played with white shirts and red shorts. Referee of the meeting was the Englishman Dickinson.

First official match
The first official match between the two teams took place on 20 November 1955, for the 1955–56 Cypriot First Division (After the unification of Cypriot football, Nea Salamina joined the Cypriot Second division, so the first official match between the two teams was played in 1955 when they were promoted to the Cypriot first division). The match was part of the first round of the championship in their common headquarters in GSE Stadium. Typically, the home team was Anorthosis. Nea Salamina won 3–2. This victory was the first for Nea Salamina against Anorthosis, but also their first in the Cypriot First Division.

Teams:

Anorthosis lineup: –

Nea Salamina lineup: Michael Sophocles "Blakkis", Kalafatis Fokkis, Takis Kkafas, Vasoudi, Andreas Elias "Andrellis", Anthony Vrachimis "Tzioumpis", George Avetisian "Tziortzis", Kostakis, Sotiris Photiou "Tirimo", Mitsios Deryneiotis

Host stadiums

Anorthosis were using the GSE Stadium as their home until 1974. Nea Salamina used that stadium from 1953 (until 1974), after the unification of Cypriot football (GSE authorities did not allow use of GSE Stadium during the period 1948–1953). Therefore, the games between the two teams from 1953 to 1974 were played at GSE Stadium. The last match between the two teams in GSE Stadium was on 7 April 1974, in the 1973–74 Cypriot First Division. Anorthosis won 1–0.

After the Turkish invasion of Cyprus and the occupation of Famagusta by the Turkish troops, the two teams were using football stadiums in other cities and regions of Cyprus. Therefore, the matches between the two teams were played at various stadiums.

The first match between the two teams after the occupation of Famagusta was held on 16 February 1975 in the 1974–75 Cypriot First Division. The home team was Anorthosis. The game was played at the Paralimni Municipal Stadium, the temporary home ground of Anorthosis. Nea Salamina won 1–0.

In 1986, the construction of Antonis Papadopoulos Stadium was completed and since then is the home stadium of Anorthosis. The same stadium was also the home stadium of Nea Salamina from 1987 until 1991. In 1991, the construction of Ammochostos Stadium was completed, and the stadium is used as the home of Nea Salamina to this day. The only exception was the 2004–05 Cypriot First Division when Nea Salamina used Antonis Papadopoulos Stadium as their home due to the need of improvement of Ammochostos Stadium, in order to be able to host Cypriot First Division matches. Thus, during this period the matches between the two teams were both played at Antonis Papadopoulos Stadium.

Records and statistics

Overall statistics
The table below presents the history of all matches between Anorthosis and Nea Salamina for the official competitions (Cypriot First Division, Cypriot Cup).

With Anorthosis as home team
The table below presents the history of all matches with Anorthosis as home team (from 1953 to 1974 and from 1987 to 1991 the two teams used the same stadium as home ground).

With Nea Salamis as home team
The table below presents the history of all matches with Nea Salamis as home team (from 1953 to 1974 and from 1987 to 1991 the two teams used the same stadium as home ground).

Results per competition
The two teams played against each other in two competitions: Cypriot First Division and Cypriot Cup.

Cypriot First Division
In the Cypriot First Division, the two teams competed in 56 official seasons. Furthermore, they also competed in the 1963–64 Cypriot First Division, which was abandoned. The two teams only played one match against each other that season that counted as official.

The two teams faced each other two times in each season. Exceptions were: a) In the 1994–95 Cypriot First Division, three games were played because the league consisted of three rounds (two games with Anorthosis as home team and one game with Nea Salamina as home team), b) In the 2015–16 Cypriot First Division, four games were played because for the first time, the two teams took part in the same group for the second phase of the league.

In the 1979–80, 2001–02, 2003–04, 2008–09 and 2010–11 seasons, the Famagusta derby was not held because Nea Salamina took part in the Cypriot Second Division.

The table below shows all the results of the two teams in the Cypriot First Division.

Cypriot Cup
For the Cypriot Cup, the two teams faced each other four times in knockout games (three times in the quarter-finals and one time in the semi-finals) and one time in the group stage. Anorthosis qualified three times and Nea Salamina one time. In the 2003–04 Cypriot Cup, the two teams participated in the same group of four teams (round of 16). Anorthosis took 2nd place and qualified for the next round, while Nea Salamina took third place and was eliminated.

Head-to-head ranking in the Cypriot First Division
The table below shows the positions the two teams finished per period in the Cypriot First Division.

• Total: Anorthosis was higher 49 times, Nea Salamina was higher 6 times.

Statistic per stadium
The tables below present the history of all matches between Anorthosis and Nea Salamina for the official competitions (Cypriot First Division, Cypriot Cup) per stadium.

At GSE Stadium, the common stadium of the two teams before the occupation of Famagusta, 34 league matches were played between the two teams. Anorthosis won 17, Nea Salamina won 10 and the remaining 7 ended in a draw.

 With Anorthosis as home team 
The tables below present the history of all matches with Anorthosis as home team for the official competitions (Cypriot First Division, Cypriot Cup) per stadium.

 With Nea Salamis as home team 

The tables below present the history of all matches with Nea Salamis as home team for the official competitions (Cypriot First Division, Cypriot Cup) per stadium.

Results frequency

Total

The table below shows the frequency of the results of the games between the two teams (regardless of home team and competition).

Analytics

The table below shows the frequency of the results of the games between the two teams by home teams (regardless of competition).

Players in both teams
The following table shows players who played for both Famagusta teams.

References

Sources 

Προϊστορία Νέα Σαλαμίνα vs Ανόρθωση

Bibliography
 
 
 
 

 

Football in Cyprus
Nea Salamis Famagusta FC
Anorthosis Famagusta F.C.
Football derbies in Cyprus